During the 2010–11 season, the Italian football club Torino F.C. was placed eighth in the Serie B league and reached the third round of the Coppa Italia competition.

Squad

First team

As of 31 January 2011.

Competitions

Serie B

Standings

Matches

Coppa Italia

References

2010-11
Italian football clubs 2010–11 season